Class Warfare is a book of collected interviews with Noam Chomsky conducted by David Barsamian. It was first published in the United States by Common Courage Press, and in the United Kingdom by Pluto Press, in 1996.

Publishing history
The book was published in clothbound and paperback forms in 1996.

It was republished by Oxford University Press (New Delhi) in 2005.

Influence
Writer Rob Williams has stated that Class War was a major inspiration for his superhero comic book series Cla$$war.

See also
Class warfare

Notes

External links
Robert McNamara  excerpt
Education is Ignorance excerpt
Looking for the Magic Answer? excerpt
Full text of Class Warfare from archive.org
Full text of Class Warfare from archive.org

Books by Noam Chomsky
Political books
1996 non-fiction books
American non-fiction books
Books critical of capitalism
Books about politics of the United States